Graven may refer to:

 Engraving, the practice of incising a design onto a hard, usually flat surface
 Graven (surname)
 Graven, Aarhus, a street in Aarhus, Denmark
 Graven (video game), a video game